Pierrot, also retrospectively known as  Gilles, is an oil on canvas painting of  by the French Rococo artist Jean-Antoine Watteau (1684–1721). Completed in the later phase of Watteau's career, Pierrot measures 184.5 by 149.5 cm, which makes up somewhat unusual case in the artist's body of work. The painting depicts a number of actors portraying commedia dell'arte character types, with one as the titular character set in the foreground.

By the early 19th century, Pierrot belonged to Dominique Vivant, Baron Denon, the first director of the Louvre Museum; it later passed to the Parisian physician Louis La Caze, who had his collection bequeathed to the Louvre in 1869.

References

Further reading

External links
 Pierrot, formerly known as Gilles at the Louvre's official web site
 Gilles at the Web Gallery of Art

1710s paintings
Paintings by Antoine Watteau
Paintings in the Louvre by French artists
Clowns in art